Marcelo Silva may refer to:

 Marcelo Silva (footballer, born 1976), Brazilian football defensive midfielder
 Marcelo Silva (footballer, born 1989), Uruguayan football centre-back

See also
 Marcelinho (footballer, born September 1984) (born 1973), born Marcelo Oliveira Silva, Brazilian football striker